Maurice Patrick Goddard (28 September 1921 – 19 June 1974) was a New Zealand rugby union player. He played 20 matches for the All Blacks including five internationals, scoring nine tries in all.

During World War II, Goddard served in both the army and air force, and made appearances in rugby matches for New Zealand Services, England Services, Combined Dominions and the Royal Air Force.

Goddard died in Christchurch on 19 June 1974, and was buried at Timaru Cemetery.

References

1921 births
1974 deaths
Rugby union players from Timaru
People educated at Timaru Boys' High School
New Zealand rugby union players
New Zealand international rugby union players
Mid Canterbury rugby union players
South Canterbury rugby union players
Rugby union centres
New Zealand military personnel of World War II
Burials at Timaru Cemetery